Texon is a small unincorporated desert hamlet in Reagan County, Texas, United States, in the western part of the state about half a mile south of the nearest highway. The town was originally an oil boomtown but is now near abandonment. There may be only one or two homes left in Texon, and no businesses or services. Google Maps could not be bothered driving down to videograph it.

Population and location
The population in 1996 was estimated at less than 10. At its peak in 1933, the town had approximately 1,200 inhabitants. The town is located in Reagan County. It is 3/10 mile (0.5 km) south of U.S. Route 67 on RM 1675. 
 It is 85 miles west of San Angelo, Texas. Texon was served by the Kansas City, Mexico and Orient Railway.

History
The town originates from May 28, 1923, when oil was discovered.
The town was named for the Texon Oil and Land Company, which drilled the first successful oil well in the Permian Basin, the Santa Rita. On December 4, 1928, under the supervision of Carl G. Cromwell, Texon Oil discovered the Santa Rita University 1-B, at that time the world's deepest well at 8,525 feet. Texon Oil and Land Company  developed the Santa Rita oil field. Texon's leases were subsequently purchased by M. L. "Mike" Benedum and Joe Trees of Pittsburgh, who formed the Big Lake Oil Company.

Texon was considered a model oil community. A grade school, a church, a hospital, a theater, a swimming pool, a golf course, and tennis courts were built by the Big Lake Oil Company.  The Texon Oilers semiprofessional baseball team was started. Privately owned businesses appeared, including a drug store, a cafe, a boarding house, a tailor shop, dry-goods and grocery stores, barber and beauty shops, a service station, a dairy, an ice house, and a bowling alley.

Ownership passed on to successive oil companies, including Plymouth Oil Company (in 1956) and Ohio Oil (now Marathon Oil) in 1962, which chose not to maintain the town that had at that time 100 residents. In 1986, the post office was closed.

In the 1920s, wastewater from oil extraction was released onto the ground, which caused extreme damage to vegetation and soil, to the point that the resulting scar can still be seen on satellite images. Cleanup is still ongoing.

Limited redevelopment
Historical markers have been installed in the town, as have new reflective type street signs and new mailboxes. Also, some activity is occurring in some of the oil wells.

References 

Unincorporated communities in Reagan County, Texas
Unincorporated communities in Texas
Ghost towns in West Texas
Company towns in Texas